is a Japanese sports shooter. He competed in the mixed skeet event at the 1984 Summer Olympics.

References

1949 births
Living people
Japanese male sport shooters
Olympic shooters of Japan
Shooters at the 1984 Summer Olympics
Place of birth missing (living people)
20th-century Japanese people